The Fuyuan River is a tributary of the Xiuguluan River in Taiwan. Originating from the Dan Mountain, it flows through Hualien County for 28 km (passing through Fuyuan National Forest Recreation Area) before joining Xiuguluan River in Ruisui, Hualien.

See also
List of rivers in Taiwan

References

Rivers of Taiwan
Landforms of Hualien County